"Get Inside" is a song by Stone Sour, and the first music video the band released. It came out in 2002 for the band's eponymous album, almost a decade after the band was first created.

It is notable that this is one of the few occasions where guitarist Josh Rand plays lead guitar, instead of his usual position as rhythm guitarist. The song is part of the soundtrack of the video game True Crime: Streets of LA.

It was nominated for Best Metal Performance at the 45th Grammy Awards.

Music video
The music video shows the band performing in front of an audience at a club. It is shown to be in black and white. It has been presumed that the white light highlights the contrast between the darker lyrics of the song.

Track listing

Live in Moscow
 "Get Inside" (live) – 4:12

Awards and honors
"Get Inside" was nominated for the Grammy Award for Best Metal Performance at the 45th Annual Grammy Awards, but lost to "Here to Stay" by Korn.

References

Stone Sour songs
2002 debut singles
2002 songs
Songs written by Corey Taylor
Songs written by Shawn Economaki
Songs written by Josh Rand
Songs written by Jim Root
Nu metal songs